Brian August Potter is a British-born American pop music songwriter and record producer. With his writing partner, Dennis Lambert,  Potter wrote and produced hits songs for the Four Tops, Tavares, the Grass Roots, Hamilton, Joe Frank & Reynolds, Evie Sands, Coven, Hall and Oates, and Glen Campbell. Potter and Lambert were nominated for a Grammy Award for their production on Rhinestone Cowboy.

Career
Hailing from Billericay in Essex, England, Potter began his music career in the 1960s in London. In 1969, while Dennis Lambert was in London, the two met, with Potter eventually moving to the U.S. to begin their songwriting partnership. By 1972, they were both working for ABC Dunhill Records in Los Angeles, California, who had signed the Four Tops, after the group's decision to leave Motown Records. Lambert and Potter changed the group's sound to a West Coast R&B style, then wrote and produced the Keeper of the Castle album. Their writing credits on the album included the top-ten hits "Keeper of the Castle" and the million-seller, "Ain't No Woman (Like the One I've Got)." They continued in the same vein with follow-up albums, Main Street People (1973) and Meeting of the Minds (1974).

In 1974, Potter and Lambert began working with Glen Campbell at Capitol Records on a concept album based on the idea of an over-the-hill country musician who is uneasy about his previous fame. The resulting effort was the number one single, "Rhinestone Cowboy", and they are credited with reviving Campbell's career. The record was nominated for the Grammy Award for Record of the Year. Potter and Lambert received nominations for Producer of the Year at the 18th annual Grammy Awards.

Selected discography

Songwriting credits
"Whatcha Gonna Do About It" (Small Faces, 1965)
"One Tin Soldier" (the Original Caste, 1969; Coven, 1971; Skeeter Davis, 1972)
"To Love You" (Country Store, 1969; Tavares, 1974)
"It's a Cryin' Shame" (Gayle McCormick, 1971)
"Don't Pull Your Love" (Hamilton, Joe Frank & Reynolds, 1971; Glen Campbell, 1976)
"Two Divided by Love" and "The Runway" (The Grass Roots, 1972) 
"Ain't No Woman (Like the One I've Got)" and "Keeper of the Castle" (the Four Tops, 1972)
"Are You Man Enough" (the Four Tops, 1973, from the film Shaft in Africa)
"Mama's Little Girl" (Linda George, 1974) (also in the film Felicity, 1979)
"This Heart" (Gene Redding, 1974)
"It Only Takes a Minute" (Tavares, 1975)
"You Brought the Woman Out of Me" (Evie Sands, 1975)
"Country Boy (You Got Your Feet in L.A.)" (Glen Campbell, 1975)
TunnelVision (movie soundtrack, 1976)
"Perfect Dancer" (Marilyn McCoo, 1979)

Production credits
Keeper of the Castle (the Four Tops, 1972)
"Rock and Roll Heaven" (the Righteous Brothers, 1974)
Hard Core Poetry (Tavares, 1974)
In the City (Tavares, 1975)
Rhinestone Cowboy (Glen Campbell, 1975)
Bloodline (Glen Campbell, 1976)
"Baby Come Back" (Player, 1977)
Inner Secrets (Santana, 1978)
Tony Orlando & Dawn
The 5th Dimension 
Dusty Springfield 
Richard Harris

References

External links

English songwriters
English record producers
People from Billericay
Musicians from Essex
English emigrants to the United States
American male songwriters
American record producers
Grammy Award winners
Living people
Year of birth missing (living people)